Johnny Rollo (born in Glasgow, Scotland; died Bethlehem, Pennsylvania) was a Scottish soccer player who typically played as an inside forward, but also as both a half back and full back. He began his career with Rangers F.C., but had his greatest success in the American Soccer League. He later coached at the amateur level.

Player
In 1922, Rollo signed with Rangers F.C. of the Scottish Football League from Scottish junior side St Rochs FC playing five reserve matches, but no first team games. In 1923, he moved to St Johnstone F.C. In September 1924, Rollo left Britain, arriving in Bethlehem, Pennsylvania on 16 September 1924 where he signed with Bethlehem Steel of the American Soccer League. When he joined Bethlehem, the team was disappointed with his form, but by February 1925, he had developed into a regular starter with the team. In 1928, the ASL expelled Bethlehem when the club defied the league's boycott of the 1929 National Challenge Cup. Bethlehem then joined the Eastern Soccer League. In the process, the United States Football Association declared the ASL an "outlaw league". In 1929, the ASL came in compliance with the USFA and the ESL merged into the ASL. Rollo remained with Bethlehem Steel until it folded in 1930. He then moved to the Newark Americans, but by that time, the American Soccer League was collapsing from the financial losses caused by the 1928-1929 Soccer War and the onset of the Great Depression. The Americans folded in 1931 and Rollo moved to the New York Americans.

Coach
After his playing career, Rollo settled permanently in Bethlehem where he coached the amateur Portugal Club to the 1933-1934 Lehigh Valley Amateur Soccer League title, known as the Wilbur Cup.

References

External links
  Bio with photo

Scottish footballers
Rangers F.C. players
St Johnstone F.C. players
Scottish emigrants to the United States
American Soccer League (1921–1933) players
Eastern Professional Soccer League (1928–29) players
Bethlehem Steel F.C. (1907–1930) players
Newark Skeeters players
New York Americans (soccer) (1930–1933) players
American soccer coaches
Year of death missing
Year of birth missing
Association football forwards
Scottish expatriate sportspeople in the United States
Expatriate soccer players in the United States
Scottish expatriate footballers
Soccer players from St. Louis